Ramsden Heath is a village in Essex in the east of England. The village is close to Hanningfield Reservoir. The smaller village of Downham is immediately to the east.

In 2018 Ramsden Heath had an estimated population of 1,966. The parish council is South Hanningfield, the local authority is the City of Chelmsford and it is within the parliamentary constituency of Maldon.

Ramsden Heath has approximately 600 households.

Amenities

There are three pubs in the village: the White Horse, the Nags Head and the Fox and Hounds. There is a family-owned butcher, a cafe, hairdresser and tennis club.

The local primary school is called Downham Church of England (Voluntary Controlled) Primary School because it was once located within Downham and not Ramsden Heath.

There is also a free church and an air-conditioned village hall available for hire; it consists of a small hall, a large hall and kitchen facilities.

Transport
Ramsden Heath has nearby links to the A12 road southwest towards London (and the M25 motorway) and north towards Chelmsford, and the A127 road west also towards London and east to Southend-on-Sea. There are bus services operated by NIBS Buses and First Essex, linking the village to the railway stations at Billericay and Wickford, both of which are on the Shenfield-Southend line which connects to the Great Eastern Main Line to London.

See also
Ramsden Bellhouse

References

Villages in Essex